Mōtū is a rural community in the Gisborne District of New Zealand's North Island. It is located north of Matawai and State Highway 2. The community is centred around Mōtū River and Mōtū Falls.

Education
Motu School is a Year 1–8 co-educational state primary school. In 2019, it was a decile 7 school with a roll of 5.

References

Populated places in the Gisborne District